BLAQ Style is the first full-length album by South Korean boy band MBLAQ, and was released by J.Tune Camp on January 10, 2011 at 11 AM KST. MBLAQ's title songs will include "Stay" and "Cry". A re-release of the album, retitled BLAQ Style - 3D Edition, was released on February 22, 2011. Consisting a total of 16 tracks, the album contains the 13 tracks from BLAQ Style, as well as 3 new tracks.  Two of the three new tracks included MBLAQ's participation in its production. The track "돌아올 수 없는 (Can't Come Back)" was composed by G.O and the lyrics were written by Mir, while the song titled You was written and composed by Cheon Doong.

Included in the repackage is the CD containing all 16 tracks, and a DVD consisting of the music videos of "Stay" and "Cry", as well as a 'making of' video.

When it was released, 3D Edition topped the Hanteo charts and MBLAQ's song "Again" was used to promote The Fighter in South Korea.

Track listing 
BLAQ Style track list

BLAQ Style – 3D edition track list

Music videos
Prior to the release of the full MV for Cry, a teaser MV was released on December 29, 2010. The full MV for Cry was then released at 11am KST on January 3, 2011.
On January 10, two MV teasers for Stay were released prior to the release of the full MV on January 11.

Charts

BLAQ Style

Single chart

Sales and certifications

BLAQ Style - 3D Edition

Single chart

Sales and certifications

References

External links
 MBLAQ's Official Site

J. Tune Entertainment albums
2011 albums
MBLAQ albums